The Great British Sewing Bee is a BBC reality show that began airing on BBC Two on 2 April 2013. In the show, talented amateur sewers compete to be named "Britain's best home sewer". A spin-off of the format of The Great British Bake Off, the programme was presented by Claudia Winkleman for the first four series, with judges Patrick Grant, May Martin (series 1–3), and Esme Young (since series 4). After a three-year hiatus, the series returned in 2019, with Joe Lycett taking over as presenter. The sixth series began airing on BBC One in April 2020 and the seventh began airing in April 2021. Sara Pascoe took over as presenter from series 8, which began airing in April 2022.

Series format

The show format is similar to The Great British Bake Off in that each episode features three challenges within an overall theme. The series starts with 10 amateur sewers, with the weakest eliminated each episode. In the Pattern Challenge, the judges give them the same  pattern, which they must follow as accurately as possible. In the Transformation Challenge, each sewer is given an identical existing garment to reinvent. In the third Made-to-measure Challenge, the sewers design and create their own garments, and must adjust their patterns to fit human models.

Series overview

Series 1 (2013)

The first series of The Great British Sewing Bee started on 2 April and aired for four episodes, concluding on 23 April 2013. The series was hosted by Claudia Winkleman and the judges were WI tutor May Martin and Patrick Grant of Savile Row. The all-female final was won by Ann, with Sandra and Lauren as runners up.

Series 2 (2014)

A second series of The Great British Sewing Bee began airing on 18 February 2014 on BBC Two. The series was filmed at Metropolitan Wharf in London, with Claudia Winkleman returning as host alongside May Martin and Patrick Grant as the judges. Once again it was an all-female final, which was won by Heather, with Chinelo and Tamara as the runners up.

Series 3 (2015)

The third series of The Great British Sewing Bee began airing over six weeks from 5 February 2015 on BBC Two. It was once again filmed at Metropolitan Wharf in London, with Claudia Winkleman returning as host alongside resident judges May Martin and Patrick Grant. After six weeks of competition, the ten sewers were reduced to the three finalists - this time, there were two male and one female finalists - with Matt declared the winner, and Lorna and Neil as the runners-up.

Series 4 (2016)

The fourth series of The Great British Sewing Bee began airing on 16 May 2016. May Martin was replaced by new judge Esme Young. The finalists were Jade, Charlotte, and Joyce, with Charlotte the winner.

Series 5 (2019)

The fifth series began on 12 February 2019 on BBC Two. Joe Lycett took over from Claudia Winkleman as presenter, and Esme Young and Patrick Grant returned as judges. The series was shot at 47-49 Tanner Street. Exterior shots are of 1 Tanner Street, Bermondsey. The finalists were Juliet, Leah and Riccardo, with Juliet winning.

Series 6 (2020)

The sixth series began on 22 April 2020 on BBC One. Joe Lycett returned as presenter, and Esme Young and Patrick Grant also returned as judges. The finalists were Clare, Matt, and Nicole, with Clare winning.

Series 7 (2021)

The seventh series began on 14 April 2021 on BBC One. As with the previous season, Joe Lycett returned as host, along with Esme Young and Patrick Grant as judges. The finalists were Raph, Rebecca and Serena, with Serena winning.

Series 8 (2022)

The eighth series began airing on 27 April 2022 on BBC One. Esme Young and Patrick Grant returned as judges, whilst Sara Pascoe took over as presenter. The finalists were Annie, Brogan, Debra and Man Yee, with Annie winning.

The BBC Children in Need Sewing Bee

The Great British Sewing Bee returned for three special episodes as 12 celebrities took to the sewing machines in a bid to raise money for Children in Need.

 Winner

Episode 1

Episode 2

Episode 3

Transmissions

Series

Special

Reception

International versions

Broadcast
Australia — The series premiered on 15 December 2014 on The LifeStyle Channel.
Japan — broadcast since 3 October 2019 on  NHK Educational TV.
New Zealand - broadcast since 2021 on TVNZ

Etymology 
Historically the word bee has been used to describe a get-together where a specific action is being carried out, such as a spelling bee, husking bee, a quilting bee, or an apple bee. In the USA, the Scripps National Spelling Bee competition has been held annually since 1925. Its etymology is unclear, but the word possibly derives from the Old English word bēn, meaning prayer.

See also
Project Runway

References

External links
 
 The Great BBC Children in Need Sewing Bee
 
 

 
2013 British television series debuts
2020s British television series
BBC reality television shows
BBC television game shows
British television spin-offs
English-language television shows
Reality television spin-offs
Sewing
Reality competition television series